The Chattooga and Chickamauga Railway  is a short-line railroad which is headquartered in LaFayette, Georgia, USA. The railroad operated  of the Tennessee, Alabama and Georgia Railway (a.k.a. the TAG route) from Chattanooga, Tennessee to Kensington, Georgia, which reverted to the Norfolk Southern System and was partially removed after the Dow Reichhold Specialty Latex LLC plant in Kensington closed in August 2008. The "C&C" also operates  of the former Central of Georgia Railway from Chattanooga to Lyerly, Georgia. That line is leased from the state of Georgia.

The CCKY is owned by the Georgia Department of Transportation, and operated by CAGY Industries. The operating lease was acquired in 2008 by Genesee & Wyoming Inc. The line does see regular operations of passenger trains between Chattanooga, Tennessee and Chickamauga, Georgia during weekends in the summer months and on other published dates during the year. The passenger trains are owned and operated by the nearby  Tennessee Valley Railroad Museum and may be powered by steam locomotives or early vintage diesel electric locomotives.

Locomotives
The locomotives the C&C operates are 102 (former Chicago and North Western Transportation Company EMD GP7, now retired), 103 (former Santa Fe CF7, now retired and scrapped), 2050 (EMD GP38) and Columbus & Greenville 1804 (former Illinois Central GP11). Also, they use a Tennessee Valley Railroad Museum locomotive if one of their locomotives needs repair or is out of service.

Both the 102 and 103 were painted in the older blue and gray scheme and were retired by their parent company and replaced with newer locomotives.

Gallery

References

External links
 Official Web Site
 HawkinsRails' Chattooga & Chickamauga page

Georgia (U.S. state) railroads
Tennessee railroads
Genesee & Wyoming
Spin-offs of the Norfolk Southern Railway